HaMifratz Central railway station (Taḥanat HaRakevet Merkazit HaMifratz) is an Israeli railway passenger station in Haifa, Israel co-located with the Haifa Bay central bus station. It serves Lev HaMifratz Mall (Heart of the Bay Mall), one of Haifa's largest malls, and the surrounding Haifa Bay industrial zone in the northeast of the city.

Location
The station is situated on the north–south coastal railway and the Jezreel Valley railway and is located in the southern part of the Haifa-Bay industrial zone. The station is one of two railway stations serving this district (the other being Hutzot HaMifratz railway station), although it is much larger in terms of passenger numbers and trains serving it. The station is also one of six railway stations within Haifa's municipal borders.

History

The station was constructed during the summer of 2001 and officially opened on October 8, 2001. It was the first public railway station whose construction was entirely funded by a private enterprise (the adjacent shopping mall). A bridge connects the mall's second floor (where a small station structure exists) with the Coastal Railway's platforms on ground level just west of it. Until December 2019 the only way for passengers to access the Coastal Railway's platforms was through the mall (although access to the Jezreel Valley railway platform, completed in 2018, was only possible through the nearby bus station building). However, in December 2019 access to the railway platforms was also made possible directly from the main building of the Haifa Bay central bus station which is located just west of the mall. As such, the entire complex serves as a major public transportation interchange hub serving the region. The mall and bus station also have a separate pedestrian bridge completed in 2018 which allows access between them to non-ticketed passengers.

During the 2006 Lebanon War train service to the station was suspended after a Hezbollah Katyusha rocket hit a train depot in Haifa on July 16, 2006, killing eight Israel Railways workers. It was restored 29 days later, on August 14, two days after the ceasefire went into effect.

Train service
HaMifratz Central is a station on the main north–south coastal line of Israel Railways Nahariya–Haifa–Tel-Aviv–Modi'in/Be'er Sheva Inter-City Service), the suburban line serving Haifa's northern suburbs – The Krayot (Haifa–Kiryat Motzkin Suburban Service) and the Jezreel Valley railway. The coastal railway platforms are located to the north of the central bus station building, while the platform serving the Jezreel Valley railway is located to the west of the building. Access between the two rail lines is available through the building. The station is situated between Hutzot HaMifratz railway station to the north and Haifa Center HaShmona railway station to the south.

Station layout
Platform numbers increase in an East-to-West direction for the Coast Line section of the station. The Emek Line section of the station contains a single platform.

Ridership

Public transport connections
The railway station is co-located with HaMifratz Central Bus Station, which constitutes the public transport gateway to Haifa from the North. It is the terminus for all Egged bus lines between Haifa and its northern suburbs, as well as other cities in northern Israel. The bus terminal also serves the Metronit BRT as well as the terminus for several intracity bus lines within Haifa, operated by Egged. Apart from buses, the station is served by sherut (shared) taxis passing along Highway 4.

Construction
As of 2019, a terminal for an aerial tramway connecting the public transportation complex with the Technion University on Mount Carmel and points in between is being constructed on the site.

In the future, an additional platform serving the Jezreel Valley railway, plus additional platforms serving the Coastal railway are expected to be built at the station, as well as platforms for the proposed Haifa–Nazareth tram-train line.

References

External links
Israel Railways website

2001 establishments in Israel
Railway stations opened in 2001
Railway stations in Haifa
Railway Station